José de Jesús Saavedra Ruíz (born 25 October 1992) is a Mexican professional footballer who plays for Sonora.

References

1992 births
Living people
Association football defenders
San Luis F.C. players
Unión de Curtidores footballers
Cimarrones de Sonora players
Querétaro F.C. footballers
Ascenso MX players
Liga Premier de México players
Tercera División de México players
Footballers from Michoacán
Mexican footballers
People from Zamora, Michoacán